Nguru (or N'Gourou) is a Local Government Area in Yobe State, Nigeria.

It has an area of 916 km and a population of 270,632 at the local government there is college of education and legal studies.

The postal code of the area is 630.

The town probably dates from around the 15th century.  There is a variety of landscape types in the area, including the protected Hadejia-Nguru wetlands of Nguru Lake, and the "Sand Dunes", a semi-desert area.

Climate

Transport 
Nguru is the terminus of the Western Railway of Nigeria.

See also 
 List of Local Government Areas in Yobe State

See also 
 Railway stations in Nigeria
Federal Medical Centre, Nguru

References 

Populated places in Yobe State